Stipellula is a genus of flowering plants belonging to the family Poaceae.

Its native range is Macaronesia, Mediterranean to India, Southern Africa.

Species:

Stipellula capensis 
Stipellula magrebensis

References

Pooideae
Poaceae genera